Hermagor may refer to:

Hermagor (district), Carinthia, Austria
Hermagor-Pressegger See, a municipality in the district
Hermagor a part of the municipality
all named after Hermagoras of Aquileia (Saint Hermagoras)

See also
 Hermagoras (disambiguation)